Amigos Para Siempre is a live album from Australian vocal group The Ten Tenors with the RTVE Symphony Orchestra. The album was recorded live in Madrid, Spain in August 2009 and released as a CD/DVD set across Europe and Australia.

The album peaked at number 33 in Spain in January 2010.

Track listing

Charts

Release history

References

2009 live albums
The Ten Tenors albums
Warner Music Group live albums
Live albums by Australian artists